Amifloxacin is a fluoroquinolone antibiotic, which is similar in its activity to ciprofloxacin.

References

Fluoroquinolone antibiotics
1,4-di-hydro-7-(1-piperazinyl)-4-oxo-3-quinolinecarboxylic acids